Haim Alexander (Hebrew: חיים אלכסנדר; August 9, 1915 – March 18, 2012)   an Israeli composer.

Biography
Alexander was born in Berlin, Germany in 1915. In 1936, he emigrated to Palestine. He studied composition with Irma and Stefan Wolpe before graduating from the Jerusalem Academy of Music and Dance in 1945. Composer Miriam Shatal was one of his students. He died in Jerusalem in 2012.

Awards
He won the Engel Prize, the Israel Music Institute Prize and the ACUM prize.

References

Hebrew Wikipedia Entry
Israel Music Institute - Biography
Interview
Haim Alexander's obituary 

1915 births
2012 deaths
Israeli composers
Jewish emigrants from Nazi Germany to Mandatory Palestine
People from Berlin